Papaya Studio was an independent American video game developer based in Irvine, California. 

Papaya Studio was known for titles on the Xbox 360, Wii, PC, PlayStation 3, PlayStation 2, PlayStation Portable, Nintendo 3DS and Nintendo DS.

Games

References

External links 
 Papaya Studio profile on MobyGames

Companies based in Irvine, California
Video game companies established in 2000
Video game companies disestablished in 2013
Defunct video game companies of the United States
Video game development companies
Defunct companies based in Greater Los Angeles